Dragnet is a 1954 American crime film directed by Jack Webb and written by Richard L. Breen. The film stars Webb, Ben Alexander, Richard Boone, Ann Robinson, Stacy Harris, Virginia Gregg and Vic Perrin. The film was adapted from the radio series of the same name, and is part of the wider Dragnet media franchise. The film was released by Warner Bros. on September 4, 1954.

Plot
The film uses the inverted detective story format.  Los Angeles police detective Sergeant Joe Friday hunts down the killer of a mobster, Miller Starkie, focusing on West Coast mafia second-in-command Max Troy (played by Harris).  The film depicts illegal police harassment against a suspect cleared by a grand jury. The vendetta between Friday and Troy becomes increasingly bitter and personal as the film proceeds, leading to a brawl at a private card game between Friday, Frank Smith, and several of Troy's henchmen.  A policewoman (Robinson) infiltrates Troy's nightclub and is able to obtain vital information on the Starkie killing; Friday then gets additional evidence when an accomplice of Troy is sent out of state and killed, and the man’s wife breaks down and gives the police what they need to convict Troy.  The gangster, though, winds up never being prosecuted and dies of natural causes.

Cast
 Jack Webb as Sergeant Joe Friday 
 Ben Alexander as Officer Frank Smith 
 Richard Boone as Capt. James E. Hamilton
 Ann Robinson as Officer Grace Downey
 Stacy Harris as Max Troy
 Virginia Gregg as Ethel Starkie
 Vic Perrin as Deputy D.A. Adolph Alexander 
 Georgia Ellis as Belle Davitt
 James Griffith as Jesse Quinn
 Dick Cathcart as Roy Cleaver
 Malcolm Atterbury as Lee Reinhard
 Willard Sage as Chester Davitt
 Olan Soule as Ray Pinker

References

External links
 
 

1954 films
1954 crime films
American crime films
Films based on radio series
Films based on television series
Films directed by Jack Webb
Films scored by Walter Schumann
American police detective films
Warner Bros. films
1950s police films
1950s police procedural films
Films set in Los Angeles
1950s English-language films
1950s American films